Bafodé Diakité (born 6 January 2001) is a French professional footballer who plays as a defender for Ligue 1 club Lille.

Early life
Bafodé Diakité was born on 6 January 2001 in Toulouse, France to Guinean parents coming from Touba.

Club career

Toulouse
Diakité made his professional debut for Toulouse in a 1–0 Ligue 1 win over Reims on 5 December 2018, at the age of 17.

Lille 
On 5 August 2022, Lille announced the signing of Diakité on a four-year deal.

International career
Born in France, Diakité is of Guinean descent. He is a youth international for France.

Honours 
Toulouse

 Ligue 2: 2021–22

References

External links
 
 
 TFC Profile
 
 

2001 births
Living people
Footballers from Toulouse
Association football defenders
French footballers
France youth international footballers
French sportspeople of Guinean descent
Toulouse FC players
Lille OSC players
Ligue 1 players
Ligue 2 players
Championnat National 3 players
Black French sportspeople